Thomas C. Cowherd (March 20, 1817 – April 4, 1907) was a British-born tinsmith and poet, and father to 16 children in Brantford, Ontario, Canada, including James H. Cowherd, the second earliest manufacturer of telephones to Alexander Graham Bell.

Early life and family 

Cowherd was born in Kendal, Westmorland, England to William Cowherd (b. 1790) and Mary Cooper. When Thomas was two years of age, his mother Mary died. He apprenticed as a tinsmith from age 13 to 20 in England. His family immigrated to Canada in 1837. Cowherd eventually settled on Colborne Street in Brantford, Ontario.

He became President of the Brantford Branch Bible Society, President of the Brantford Mechanic's Institute and Literary Association, a school trustee, and was elected as a town councillor in 1869.

His first marriage, to Ann Batty (26 March 1818 – 9 March 1847), produced five children; she died in 1847 giving birth to the fifth of these, a daughter named Annie, who died later that year. Cowherd then married Ann's sister, Ellen Batty (14 January 1829 – 1926) of Westmoreland, Yorkshire, England, on 26 September 1847; they produced eleven more children. As Thomas Cowherd's career advanced he operated a tin and sheet iron shop plus a hardware store, opposite Brantford's grand Kerby House.

His children by Ann were Mary Ann (d. 1842), Thomas (b. 1840), William (1845–1893) and Anna (d. 1847).  Ellen gave birth to Jennie (b. 1848), James H. (1849-1881) who married Mary Pickering, Christopher, who worked with James producing telephones, Alfred (b. 1853?), Amelia (b. 1854), Frederick (1857–1876), Ida (b. 1858), Charles William (1865–1931), Harold, Alice and Florence (m. 1869).

Earliest telephone production 

The Cowherd family were friends and associates of the scientist and telephone inventor Alexander Graham Bell. Bell used the Cowherds' tinsmithing services to help produce new prototypes for the telephone, and to open Canada's first telephone factory (possibly the world's first such plant). Bell also called on them to string telephone lines made from common stovepipe wire, and to assist in demonstrations. Thomas spent many hours speaking with Alexander on the telephone between the Cowherd home in Brantford and the Bell Homestead, Canada's first point-to-point telephone line which ran approximately 3 miles (5 km) between the two homes. The two were said to be "great chums".

Canada's first telephone factory was built by Thomas's son, James H. Cowherd (July 1849 – 27 February 1881). It was a three-story brick building on Wharfe Street in Brantford, Ontario (next to the early home of the Brantford Expositor), at the back of the Cowherd's home property, that soon started manufacturing telephones for the Bell System, eventually leading to the city's style as The Telephone City.

Poetry and writings 

Thomas wrote verse "...with considerable merit", according to Thomas's son-in-law J.B. Parker, a journalist in Conway, Arkansas. He was a prolific poet and songwriter, and much of it appeared in newspapers (their home's property was adjacent to the Brantford Expositor). He ultimately published a collection in 1884 of over 300 pages of verse, "The Emigrant Mechanic and Other Tales Said In Verse Together With Numerous Songs Upon Canadian Subjects", which included 'An Address To Brantford, 1853':

Other verses included 'To The Christians Of Brantford' (1853), advising the public on the perils of alcohol in a moralistic overtone, as well as verses of praise to the visiting Prince of Wales (1860):

Later years 

Correspondence between Thomas and Bell often contained conversations about Jesus Christ. Cowherd was himself a Methodist and was called "quite preachy".

Their son-in-law, J.B. Parker, described Thomas's home as "Just a typical English family, enjoying its own fireside and historical and magazine reading, with Thomas H. Cowherd inclined to poetical effusions and enjoying considerable prominence as a contributor to the press and later publishing a volume of his poems."  The Bells were frequent visitors to their home, and Cowherd's wife was accomplished at producing home-brew from the family's mammoth vines.  "...most of the brew went to invalids, for they gave much of their time and funds to looking after undernourished and aged people in temporary distress".

Thomas Cowherd died in Chatham, Ontario in 1907. He is buried in Greenwood Cemetery in Brantford, Ontario.

See also 

 Bell Telephone Memorial

References 

 Footnotes

 Citations

 Bibliography

 Reville, F. Douglas. History of the County of Brant: Illustrated With Fifty Half-Tones Taken From Miniatures And Photographs, Brantford, ON: Brant Historical Society, Hurley Printing, 1920.  Retrieved from Brantford.Library.on.ca on 4 May 2012.

External links 
 
 
 His poems at Poemhunter
 His poems at reedbookonline

1817 births
1907 deaths
English expatriates in Canada
People from Kendal
Alexander Graham Bell
English male poets
History of Brantford